Mogi Guaçu is a municipality in the state of São Paulo in Brazil. Mogi Guaçu is a place name that probably originates from the Tupi language. It means "large river of snakes". The city was founded on April 9, 1877.

The municipality contains the  Mogi-Guaçu Biological Reserve, a fully protected conservation area created in 1942.

Sister Cities 
 Estiva Gerbi, Brazil
 Itapira, Brazil
 Mogi Mirim, Brazil

References

Populated places established in 1877
Municipalities in São Paulo (state)
1877 establishments in Brazil